Maccabi London Lions Football Club is a football club based in Barnet, London, England.

History
The club was established as MALEX in 1995 by Maccabi Association London who were seeking a new challenge beyond Sunday league football. The new club joined Division One of the Hertfordshire Senior County League. In 1999 they were renamed London Lions, but remained an all-Jewish club. Their first season under the new name saw them win the Division One title, earning promotion to the Premier Division. In 2006–07 the club won the Herts Centenary Trophy, beating Metropolitan Police in the final.

London Lions were Premier Division runners-up in 2008–09 and went on to win the league in 2009–10, resulting in promotion to Division One of the Spartan South Midlands League. They won the Herts Centenary Trophy for a second time the following season with a 3–2 win over Letchworth Garden City Eagles in the final. In 2012–13 the club won the Division One title, resulting in promotion to the Premier Division. However, they finished bottom of the Premier Division the following season and were relegated back to Division One.

After finishing seventeenth in Division One in 2014–15, London Lions dropped back into the Premier Division of the Hertfordshire Senior County League. Renamed Maccabi London Lions, they won the Anagram Records Trophy in 2015–16. The following season saw the club win the Herts Centenary Trophy, the league's Aubrey Cup and the Premier Division title, resulting in promotion back to Division One of the Spartan South Midlands League. In 2017–18 the club won the Division One Cup with a 3–1 win over Southall in the final. The following season saw them win the Herts Centenary Trophy, defeating Belstone 5–1 in the final. Following the curtailment of the 2020–21 season due to the COVID-19 pandemic, the club won the Spring Cup, an emergency competition organised by the league. At the end of the season they were transferred to Division One of the Combined Counties League, which the club won at the first attempt to earn promotion to the Premier Division; later completing a double by winning the Division One Challenge Cup.

Ground
The club were initially based at the International University in Bushey before moving several times and playing at grounds including the Copthall Stadium in Hendon and the Gosling Stadium. In 2002 they relocated to Rowley Lane in Arkley. However, when the club were promoted to the Spartan South Midlands League in 2010, they were required to groundshare at St Albans City, Broxbourne Borough and Hemel Hempstead Town as Rowley Lane did not have floodlights or a stand. In 2015 the club returned to Rowley Lane after floodlights were installed and the Alan Mattey Stand erected, named after a former player who died in 2006.

Honours
Spartan South Midlands League
Division One champions 2012–13
Division One Cup winners 2017–18
Spring Cup winners 2020–21
Combined Counties Football League
Division One champions 2021–22
Division One Challenge Cup winners 2021–22
Hertfordshire Senior County League
Premier Division champions 2009–10, 2016–17
Division One champions 1999–2000
Aubrey Cup winners 2016–17
Anagram Records Trophy
Winners 2015–16
Herts Centenary Trophy
Winners 2006–07, 2010–11, 2016–17, 2018–19

Records
Best FA Cup performance: First qualifying round, 2012–13
Best FA Vase performance: Fourth round, 2021–22
Record attendance: 197 vs Clapton, FA Vase first round, 21 October 2017
Biggest win: 14–2 vs Bedmond S&S, Hertfordshire Senior County League Premier Division, 2009–10
Heaviest defeat: 11–1 vs Cockfosters, Spartan South Midlands League Premier Division, 2013–14
Most appearances: Adam Myeroff, 507
Most goals: Max Kyte, 135

See also
London Lions F.C. players

References

External links
Official website

Jewish football clubs
Football clubs in England
Football clubs in Hertfordshire
Football clubs in London
London
Association football clubs established in 1995
1995 establishments in England
Sport in the London Borough of Barnet
Hertfordshire Senior County League
Spartan South Midlands Football League
Diaspora sports clubs in the United Kingdom
Combined Counties Football League
Diaspora association football clubs in England